Serratula is a genus of plants in the tribe Cardueae within the family Asteraceae native to Eurasia.  Plumeless saw-wort is a common name for plants in this genus. Serratula as traditionally defined contains at least two groups: one of which is basal within the subtribe Centaureinae and one of which is derived; the former group can be moved to the genus Klasea.

Various species contain apigenin, luteolin, quercetin, other flavonoids and ecdysteroids.

 Species

 Formerly included
Numerous species are now considered members of other genera:

 Acilepis
 Baccharoides
 Carphephorus
 Chronopappus
 Cirsium
 Crupina
 Cyanthillium
 Goniocaulon
 Hemistepta
 Heterocoma
 Hololepis
 Jurinea
 Klasea
 Laggera
 Liatris
 Lucilia
 Olgaea
 Oligochaeta
 Ptilostemon
 Rhaponticum
 Saussurea
 Scrobicaria
 Stemmacantha
 Synurus
 Syreitschikovia
 Vernonia

References 

Asteraceae genera
Cynareae